James Kent Brooker (August 12, 1902 - September 25, 1973) was an American athlete who competed in the men's pole vault.  He competed in Athletics at the 1924 Summer Olympics in Paris and won bronze, behind fellow American polevaulters Lee Barnes and Glen Graham, who won gold and silver medals respectively. He was known for his consistency in the pole vault and was considered "a typical acrobat pole vaulter and does more with his hands than any other vaulter in the country."

Brooker was born in Cass City, Michigan and attended Michigan Agricultural College and later the University of Michigan. He competed in the pole vault for both schools. He was selected as captain of the Michigan track team.

References

External links 
 
 

1902 births
1973 deaths
University of Michigan alumni
American male pole vaulters
Athletes (track and field) at the 1924 Summer Olympics
Olympic bronze medalists for the United States in track and field
People from Cass City, Michigan
Medalists at the 1924 Summer Olympics